"Colors" is a single from Norwegian DJ and electronic music duo Broiler. It was released in Norway on 29 November 2013 for digital download. The song peaked at number 18 on the Norwegian Singles Chart. The song is included on their EP Episode 1 (2013).

Track listing

Chart performance

Weekly charts

Release history

References

DJ Broiler songs
Universal Music Group singles
2013 songs